Kenneth Edwin Heizer (February 8, 1924 – February 17, 2011) was an American football player and coach. He served as the head football coach at Simpson College in Indianola, Iowa from 1962 to 1965, compiling a record of 14–22. Heizer played college football at Western State College of Colorado—now known as Western Colorado University—in Gunnison, Colorado. He also served as a scout for the Denver Broncos of the National Football League (NFL).

Head coaching record

References

1924 births
2011 deaths
American football centers
Denver Broncos scouts
Simpson Storm football coaches
Western Colorado Mountaineers football players
People from Las Animas, Colorado
Players of American football from Colorado